The 12552/12551 Kamakhya–SMVT Bengaluru AC Superfast Express is a Superfast Express train belonging to Indian Railways – Northeast Frontier Railway zone which connects cities Bangalore the capital of  Karnataka and Guwahati the capital of  Assam, that runs between  and Sir M. Visvesvaraya Terminal, Bengaluru in India.

It operates as train number 12552 from Kamakhya to Sir M. Visvesvaraya Terminal and as train number 12551 in the reverse direction, serving the 7 states of Assam, West Bengal, Bihar, Odisha, Andhra Pradesh, Tamil Nadu and Karnataka.

Coaches

The 12552 / 51 Kamakhya Junction–SMVT Bangalore AC Express has 1 AC 1st Class, 4 AC 2 tier, 11 AC 3 tier & 2 End-on Generator Coaches. In addition, it carries a pantry car   .

As is customary with most train services in India, coach composition may be amended at the discretion of Indian Railways depending on demand.

Service

As the average speed of the train is above , as per Indian Railways rules, its fare includes a Superfast surcharge.

Routing

The 12552 / 51 Kamakhya Junction–Sir M. Visvesvaraya Terminal AC Express runs from

ASSAM
 Kamakhya Junction  (Starts) 
 Rangiya
 New Bongaigaon

WEST BENGAL
 
 New Cooch Behar
 New Jalpaiguri Junction (Siliguri)
 
 Rampurhat
 
 
 
 Bankura
 Midnapore
 Hijli (Kharagpur)

BIHAR
 
 Barsoi

ODISHA
 
 
 
 
 Brahmapur

ANDHRA PRADESH
 
 
 
 

TAMIL NADU
 MGR Chennai Central
 
 Jolarpettai 

KARNATAKA
 Sir M. Visvesvaraya Terminal (Ends).

Reversal

Traction

As the entire route is fully electrified. A Howda hauls the train from Kamakhya Junction up to  handing over to a Howda-based WAP-5 until  after which a Lallaguda or Erode-based WAP-5 locomotive powers the train all the way up to Sir M. Visvesvaraya Terminal.  .

Operation

12552 Kamakhya Junction–Sir M. Visvesvaraya Terminal AC Express runs from Kamakhya Junction every Wednesday reaching SMVT Bangalore on the 3rd day i.e. Friday .
12551 Sir M. Visvesvaraya Terminal  Junction–Kamakhya Junction AC Express runs from SMVT Bangalore every Saturday reaching Kamakhya Junction on the 3rd day i.e. Monday .

Accidents 
On 8 October 2022, A 31-year-old lady travelling with her 3-year-old child and elderly mother slipped and fell between platform no. 1 and the adjoining tracks while hurriedly boarding a moving 12551 SMVT Bengaluru–Kamakhya AC Superfast Express with a manually operated door at SMVT Bengaluru. The lady was initially saved by an officer of the Government Railway Police, who pulled her out onto the platform. She had a fractured arm but unfortunately died while en route to the Bowring & Lady Curzon Hospitals in Shivajinagara, Bengaluru.

See also
Chennai–New Jalpaiguri Superfast Express
Nagaon Express
Guwahati–Bengaluru Cantt. Superfast Express
Thiruvananthapuram–Silchar Superfast Express
New Tinsukia–Bengaluru Weekly Express
Bangalore Cantonment–Agartala Humsafar Express
Dibrugarh–Kanyakumari Vivek Express

References 

 http://www.eastcoastrail.indianrailways.gov.in/view_detail.jsp?lang=0&dcd=1481&id=0,4,268
 http://www.newindianexpress.com/cities/hyderabad/Kamakhya-to-Yesvantpur-Weekly-Train/2014/02/04/article2036924.ece

External links

Rail transport in Assam
Rail transport in West Bengal
Rail transport in Bihar
Rail transport in Odisha
Rail transport in Andhra Pradesh
Rail transport in Tamil Nadu
Rail transport in Karnataka
AC Express (Indian Railways) trains
2014 establishments in India
Transport in Guwahati
Transport in Bangalore